Carrollton is an unincorporated community in Barbour County, in the U.S. state of West Virginia. Carrollton is known for its Carrollton Covered Bridge over the Buckhannon River, listed on the National Register of Historic Places.

References

Unincorporated communities in Barbour County, West Virginia
Unincorporated communities in West Virginia